Acreichthys is a genus of filefishes native to the Indian and Pacific Oceans.

Species
There are currently 3 recognized species in this genus:
Acreichthys hajam Bleeker, 1851
Acreichthys radiatus Popta, 1900 (Radial leatherjacket)
Acreichthys tomentosus Linnaeus, 1758 (Bristle-tail filefish)

References

Monacanthidae
Taxa named by Alec Fraser-Brunner
Marine fish genera